The Minnesota Amateur Golf Championship is an annual golf tournament in the American state of Minnesota.

Winners 

Source:

1 Rain shortened the event to 36 holes
2 Won playoff
3 Defeated Steinfeldt at sudden-death playoff to win runner-up
4 Defeated Bill Anderson at a playoff to win runner-up
5 Defeated Paul Strande at the first sudden-death playoff hole to win runner-up
6 Clasen won 18-hole playoff, 69–78

References 

Amateur golf tournaments in the United States
Recurring sporting events established in 1901
1901 establishments in Minnesota